Lakshmipur-2 is a constituency represented in the Jatiya Sangsad (National Parliament) of Bangladesh since 2019 by independent politician Mohammad Shahid Islam.

Boundaries 
The constituency encompasses Raipur Upazila and eight union parishads of Lakshmipur Sadar Upazila: Basikpur, Char Ruhita, Dakshin Hamchadi, Dalal Bazar, Parbati Nagar, Shak Char, Tum Char, and Uttar Hamchadi.

History 
The constituency was created in 1984 from a Noakhali constituency when the former Noakhali District was split into three districts: Feni, Noakhali, and Lakshmipur.

Members of Parliament

Elections

Elections in the 2010s 
Mohammad Noman was elected unopposed in the 2014 general election after opposition parties withdrew their candidacies in a boycott of the election.

Elections in the 2000s 

Khaleda Zia stood for five seats in the 2001 general election: Bogra-6, Bogra-7, Feni-1, Khulna-2 and Lakshmipur-2. After winning all five, she chose to represent Bogra-6 and quit the other four, triggering by-elections in them. Abul Khair Bhuiyan of the BNP was elected unopposed in the by-election scheduled for November.

Elections in the 1990s 
Khaleda Zia stood for five seats in the June 1996 general election: Bogra-6, Bogra-7, Feni-1, Lakshmipur-2 and Chittagong-1. After winning all five, she chose to represent Feni-1 and quit the other four, triggering by-elections in them. Harunur Rashid of the Awami League was elected in a September 1996 by-election.

References

External links
 

Parliamentary constituencies in Bangladesh
Lakshmipur District